The Toutle River is a  tributary of the Cowlitz River in the U.S. state of Washington.

The river was altered by the 1980 eruption of Mount St. Helens, a nearby volcano, and subsequent flows of ash and other debris. It was further altered by dredging to remove sediment, and by construction of the Toutle River Sediment Retention Structure on the North Fork Toutle River.

Course
The Toutle River begins at the confluence of the North Fork Toutle River and the South Fork Toutle River near the community of Toutle. The forks originate on Mount St. Helens in Mount St. Helens National Volcanic Monument, and flow generally west to form the main stem, which continues generally west, with significant north–south deviations. The town of Toutle lies to the left of the river at river mile (RM) 17.2 or river kilometer (RK) 27.7.

At first the Toutle River flows north for about  along the base of Beigle Mountain, which is on its right. The river continues generally north until, at about RM 13 (RK 21), it begins a sweeping turn to the southwest. For the next several miles, Tower Road runs along the right bank of the river, and at about RM 10 (RK 16) Tower Cemetery is on the right. Downstream of the cemetery, the river passes through Hollywood Gorge, where Rock Creek enters from the right. The river continues southwest through RM 7 (RK 11), where it receives Stankey Creek from the left.

The Toutle River then turns west, passing under Tower Road and receiving Cline Creek from the right. Over the next stretch, Burma Road is on the right. Over its final , the Toutle meanders generally southwest through large deposits of sand.

Discharge
The United States Geological Survey monitors the flow of the Toutle River at a stream gauge at RM 6.5 (RK 10.5). This data covers a 30-year period that began in 1981, after the volcanic eruption. Extremes outside the period of record include two large floods on May 18, 1980, related to volcanic mud flows that came down the South Fork and then the North Fork, spaced nine hours apart.

Volcanic sediment
The eruption of Mount St. Helens and subsequent lahars poured vast amounts of sediment into the Toutle.  The United States Army Corps of Engineers dredged sediment from the river and built the $65 million Toutle River Sediment Retention Structure on the North Fork Toutle River to prevent debris from continuing downstream.

Part of the same engineering works is a tunnel to drain Spirit Lake, on the north side of the volcano, after the eruption blocked the lake's natural outlet.

Gallery

See also

North Fork Toutle River
List of rivers of Washington
List of tributaries of the Columbia River
Mount St. Helens National Volcanic Monument

References

Rivers of Washington (state)
Rivers of Cowlitz County, Washington
Mount St. Helens
Gifford Pinchot National Forest